KGCS-LD, virtual and UHF digital channel 21, is a low-powered YTA TV-affiliated television station licensed to Joplin, Missouri, United States. The station is owned by the Board of Governors at Missouri Southern State University. The station was formerly an affiliate of America One.

History 
The station began in September 1984 as MSTV, a cable-exclusive student-access television station. Student-produced programming was the main staple for the channel. The channel began broadcasting city council meetings in Joplin, and those broadcasts still happen on the station in the present. Although the construction permit for the over-the-air signal was issued in January 1986, it was not on the air until sometime in 1988. In 1988, the station launched as K57DR, operating on analog UHF channel 57. The transmitter was erected just before the signal went on the air. In 1995, the station's callsign was changed to KGCS-LP. The station's digital signal on UHF channel 22 has been on the air since 2008, and the station changed the call letters to the current KGCS-LD in July 2009 after voluntarily shutting down their analog signal.

References

External links

KGCS-TV Website

GCS-LD
Television channels and stations established in 1988
Low-power television stations in the United States
Missouri Southern State University
1988 establishments in Missouri
YTA TV affiliates